Finnish regional road 100, commonly known as Hakamäentie ), is a regional road in Helsinki. The road is an important cross-section between the northern districts of the Helsinki peninsula and part of the planned Pasilanväylä.

Hakamäentie leads from Käpylä north of east and west Pasila to Haaga. In the east, it is extended by the Koskelantie leading to Vanhakaupunki and Lahdenväylä. At the western end of Hakamäentie, there is a tunnel leading to Vihdintie and an interchange, to which the Mannerheimintie leading north from the center of Helsinki ends and from which also Hämeenlinnanväylä (national road 3) to the north and Vihdintie (regional road 120) to the west. There are a number of bridges along Hakamäentie that cross the main line, the beach line and the line that diverges from it, leading to the Ilmala service line yard. The road also crosses the valley in the Central Park and the outdoor roads run there. Hakamäentie passes Hartwall Arena and Ilmala railway station.

On weekdays, the average number of vehicles on the road in 2011 was 42,000 cars per day at Central Park. If road extensions costing around €500 million are carried out according to preliminary plans, almost 20,000 cars a day would be on the road in 2035.

References

External links 

Roads in Finland
Transport in Helsinki